The 1929 Furman Purple Hurricane football team represented the Furman University as a member of the Southern Intercollegiate Athletic Association (SIAA) during the 1929 college football season. Led by second year head coach T. B. Amis, the Purple Hurricane compiled an overall record of 5–4–1, with a mark of 4–1–1 in conference play, and finished eighth in the SIAA.

Schedule

References

Furman
Furman Paladins football seasons
Furman Purple Hurricane football